Rolf Gerhard Tiedemann (8 February 1941 – 1 August 2019), better known as R. G. Tiedemann or Gary Tiedemann, was a German historian of Christianity in China.

Biography 
Born in Hartenholm, Schleswig-Holstein in wartime Germany, Tiedemann left school as a teenager. At 21 he settled with family in Wisconsin, and was later drafted to train in the US army's Medical Training Unit in Texas during the Vietnam War. He completed a BA at University of Wisconsin–Milwaukee, followed by an MA and a PhD at SOAS University of London. After taking several part-time posts, Tiedemann spent twenty years teaching Modern History of China in SOAS's Department of History, including a sabbatical at the Ricci Institute, University of San Francisco. After his retirement, he maintained a post as Professorial Research Associate at SOAS and as Professor of Chinese History, Shandong University, Jinan.

His research mainly concerned the history of Christianity in China, with a particular focus on Shandong and the Boxer Rebellion. He also edited the second volume of the Handbook of Christianity in China, which totalled over a thousand pages; about half of the entries he wrote himself. Tiedemann was also a review editor of Journal of Peasant Studies.

A festschrift was published in honor of Tiedemann, edited by two of his former students, entitled The Church as Safe Haven (2018).

Tiedemann died on 1 August 2019, after suffering from illness for many years.

Works

References 

1941 births
2019 deaths
Religion academics
20th-century German historians
Christian missions in China
World Christianity scholars
History of Christianity in China
University of Wisconsin–Milwaukee alumni
Alumni of SOAS University of London
Academics of SOAS University of London
21st-century German historians